The Military ranks of the Polish People's Republic were the military insignia used by the Polish People's Army.

Army

Officer timeline

Enlisted timeline

Air and Air Defence Force

Officer timeline

Enlisted timeline

Navy

Officer timeline

References

External links
 

Military ranks of Poland
Polish People's Republic